Roberta Vinci was the defending champion, but chose to compete at the Kremlin Cup instead.

First Seed Victoria Azarenka won the tournament beating unseeded Monica Niculescu in the final, 6–2, 6–2.

Seeds

Qualifying

Draw

Finals

Top half

Bottom half

References
 Main draw

2011 Singles
BGL Luxembourg Open - Singles
2011 in Luxembourgian tennis